Port Perry is a community located in Scugog, Ontario, Canada. Port Perry has a population of 9,553 as of 2021.
Port Perry serves as the administrative and commercial centre for the township of Scugog. The town is home to a 24-bed hospital (Lakeridge Health Port Perry), Scugog Township's municipal offices and many retail establishments. Port Perry serves as a hub for many small communities in the Scugog area, such as Greenbank, Raglan, Caesarea, Blackstock and Nestleton/Nestleton Station. The Great Blue Heron Charitable Casino is a major employer. Located at the basin of the Trent-Severn Waterways is Lake Scugog, one of Ontario's largest man-made lakes.

History

The area around Port Perry was first surveyed as part of Reach Township by Major Samuel Street Wilmot in 1809.  The first settler in the area was Reuben Crandell, a United Empire Loyalist who built a homestead with his wife in May 1821.  Their original home is still in use and can be seen on King Street between Prince Albert and Manchester.  In November 1821, Lucy Ann Crandell became the first child of European descent born in the area.  In 1831, Crandell and his family moved to a homestead at what became Crandell's Corners (later called Borelia). It had its own Post Office, near the present-day junction of Queen Street and Highway 7A.

Settler Peter Perry laid out village lots on the shore of Lake Scugog in 1848 on the site of a former native village known as Scugog Village. The townsite was named Port Perry in 1852 and its first Postmaster was Joseph Bigelow. It was incorporated as a village in 1871. At the time there was an intense rivalry between Port Perry and two nearby towns, Prince Albert and Manchester. Expecting great things for "his" town, Peter Perry predicted that goats would eat grass off of Prince Albert's main street.

At the time, Prince Albert sat astride a planked toll road running south to Whitby. Grain and lumber from areas throughout the area south-east of Lake Simcoe fed through Prince Albert, which was a major grain trading area. Perry and others in Port Perry felt a railway was a much better option, and Perry's prediction would eventually come true.

A group of local businessmen started the process of bringing the railway to the town in 1867, and the first train on the Port Whitby and Port Perry Railway reached the terminus in Port Perry in 1872. In the following year the grain elevator was built, still standing today as Canada's oldest existing grain elevator. Cargo from all over northern Ontario was shipped via the Trent-Severn Waterway to Port Perry via Lake Scugog, and then via the railway to Whitby, where it could be loaded onto the CP or CN mainlines running along the shore of Lake Ontario, or onto ships in Port Whitby. Businesses quickly moved out of Prince Albert and moved to Port Perry, leaving Prince Albert effectively a suburb of Port Perry today. The Port Perry Granary still stands as a tall sentinel on the shores of Lake Scugog and proud of being Canada's oldest grain elevator outlasting numerous fires and modern day demolition.

The village was amalgamated with Cartwright, Reach and Scugog Townships to form the Township of Scugog in 1974 upon the creation of the Regional Municipality of Durham.

An Ontario Historical Plaque was erected at the Scugog Shores Museum by the province to commemorate cartoonist Jimmy Frise's role in Ontario's heritage.

Culture and recreation

Port Perry's Victorian-era downtown is a tourist destination, with clothing stores, restaurants, cafés, bookstores, galleries and antique shops. In the summer, the town features the festivals Mississauga First Nation Pow Wow, the Highland Games, the Dragon Boat Races and StreetFest. Port Perry is also home to the Theatre on The Ridge summer theatre festival featuring 6 shows performed at Townhall 1873 during July and August. Its annual fair, held every Labour Day weekend, has been running for over 150 years. There are also golf courses, both public and private. Other attractions in Port Perry and surrounding area include the Great Blue Heron Charity Casino, Scugog Memorial Library (featuring the Kent Farndale Art Gallery), the Scugog Shores Historical Museum and the Town Hall 1873 Centre for the Performing Arts.

At many local farms, visitors may pick their own seasonal fruit (strawberries, raspberries, apples). In the summer, bass tournaments and lakeside activities are also featured.

The Lake Scugog shoreline offers two popular lakeside parks, Palmer and Birdseye. There are active fishing seasons, both winter and summer. In the winter months, Lake Scugog is dotted with ice-fishing huts and is a destination for ice fishermen and snowmobilers.

Demographics

Notable residents

 Kate Beirness, TSN sports broadcaster and Port Perry native
 George Burnett, hockey coach in National Hockey League, American Hockey League, Ontario Hockey League and Hockey Canada
 George A. Cope, CEO, Bell Canada Enterprises
 Gertrude Spurr Cutts, English-born painter spent latter part of her life in Port Perry
 Ty Dellandrea, forward for the Dallas Stars of the National Hockey League
 Brad Goreski, celebrity fashion stylist and TV personality born in Port Perry
 Vladimir Hachinski, renowned clinical neurologist and researcher in stroke and dementia; born in Ukraine and raised in Port Perry
 Bill Lishman, sculptor, filmmaker, inventor, naturalist and public speaker; lived in nearby Blackstock
 James Howden MacBrien, Commander of the Canadian Army and RCMP; born in nearby Myrtle and raised in Port Perry
 Jayde Nicole, Canadian Model, born in Scarborough and raised in Port Perry
 Daniel David Palmer, the founder of Palmer School of Chiropractic; born in Port Perry
 J. F. Paxton (1857–1936), Canadian ice hockey administrator
 Thomas Paxton (1820–1887), Port Perry industrial businessman, politician and sheriff
 Dan Petronijevic, television actor
 John Ross Roach, NHL goalie of the 1930s and born in Port Perry
 Craig Russell, female impersonator, best known for his lead role in the movie, Outrageous!; buried in Port Perry
 Emily VanCamp, film and television actress; born and raised in Port Perry
 Fred Whitcroft, amateur and NHA hockey player,  inductee of Hockey Hall of Fame; born in Port Perry

In film
Port Perry has attracted many film crews over the years, both for feature film and television; it doubled as the fictional Maine town of Mooseport in the 2004 film Welcome to Mooseport and was used briefly as a small town in New Hampshire during the sixth season of The West Wing.

The town was the primary production location for the 1996 film, Fly Away Home, based on Port Perry inventor Bill Lishman's experiments in the 1980s and 1990s imprinting geese in order to alter and preserve migration routes. The film fictionalized Lishman's personal life, but used him as a consultant for its aerial and technical production.

Port Perry is also used as exteriors for the TV series Hemlock Grove which is set in Western Pennsylvania.

American TV Series "Jack Reacher" (Season 1) was shot around Downtown Port Perry in 2020–2021. The town's "Piano Inn & Cafe" was changed into a "JJ's Ale House" for the shoot.

Port Perry is being used as a small town known as Lakeside for season three of the Amazon show American Gods (TV series). They painted the Mill black and added fake shops, the "PORT PERRY" wording at the top of the Old Mill will be changed to "LAKESIDE as well as adding fake snow around the town.

References

External links

 Discover Downtown Port Perry
Port Perry at Geographical Names of Canada

Communities in the Regional Municipality of Durham
Former municipalities in Ontario
Populated places disestablished in 1974